The Complete Collection of Trouble Funk is a double-compilation album release in 2015 by the American go-go band Trouble Funk. The album was dedicated to the memories of Robert Reed, Mac Cary, Lonnie Duckett, and Herbert Hicks.

Track listing

Disc 1: 
"E Flat Boogie" – 8:45
"Roll Wit It" – 7:10
"Pump Me Up" – 6:32
"Let's Get Small" – 5:34
"Trouble Funk Express" – 6:41
"So Early in the Morning" – 6:59
"Drop the Bomb" – 6:00
"Hey Fellas" – 7:12
"Super Grit" – 10:15
"The Beat" – 9:02

Disc 2:
"Beat 2" – 9:04
"Don't Touch That Stereo" – 6:07
"Say What" – 5:18
"Let's Get Hot" – 4:43
"Get on Up" – 4:50
"Hollyrock" – 4:36
"Latin Funk" – 5:00
"Get Down With Your Get Down" – 8:42
"Still Smokin" – 5:07
"Good Times" – 8:04
"All Aboard" – 5:16
"Dance to Troubles Beat" – 6:23
"Freaky Situation" – 3:56

Personnel

Tony "Big Tony" Fisher – lead vocals, bass guitar
Robert "Syke Dyke" Reed – vocals, electric guitar, keyboards
James "Doc" Avery – vocals, keyboards
Taylor "Monster Baby" Reed – vocals, trumpet, keyboards
Chester "Boogie" Davis – lead guitar, vocals
Emmett "EJ Roxx" Nixon – lead vocals, drums
Mac "Shorty Mac" Cary – drums, percussion
Timothy "Tee Bone" David – congas, percussion
Dean "Chops" Harris – trumpet
Dave "Cruddy" Rudd – saxophone, percussion
Keith Bazemore – trombone
Garland "Iceberg Slim" Walker – guest vocals
James Logan – CD artwork
Reo Edwards – mixing, producer

References

2015 compilation albums
Trouble Funk albums
Rhythm and blues compilation albums